Potassium polyacrylate is a potassium salt of polyacrylic acid with the chemical formula [−CH2−CH(CO2K)−]n. As a type of superabsorbent polymer, it can absorb hundreds of times its original weight in purified water.

Different from sodium polyacrylate, potassium polyacrylate can be used as water retaining agent in agriculture and won't cause soil salinization.

Uses

Water retaining agent 
As a type of superabsorbent polymer for plants (Ag-SAP), potassium polyacrylate can increase moisture availability to plants.

It mixes with soil to increase the soil’s capacity for holding water (with water gel form which stay in soil for months) and making it available to plants. This improved soil readily releases moisture, along with water-soluble nutrients, to plant roots on demand. The specific retention of potassium polyacrylate is weaker than roots of most plants.

There are claims it can be used in seed coating, grow seedlings, planting crops, topdressing for crops, planting/transplanting trees, flower transport etc.

Mechanism 

Potassium polyacrylate works similar to a sponge under the soil surface. It is composed of a set of polymeric chains, which are linked together chemically to become a water-insoluble matrix that gently attracts and holds hydrogen molecules. The immense size and weight of its molecular structure allows each potassium polyacrylate granule to absorb purified water of over 500 times its dry weight.

The polyacrylate structure does not bind water very tightly - a plant's root suction is sufficient to release just the requested  amount - but tightly enough to prevent waterlogging or other ill effects caused by free water filling air cavities in the soil.

Potassium polyacrylate absorbs and releases soil nutrients, water-soluble fertilizer and chemicals much in the same manner as water. It has been alleged that this creates a healthy microenvironment in the plant root zone, and maximizes plant growth by reducing plant stress, with the result of faster germination, quicker emergence of seeds, consistent growth and higher, better-quality yields of edibles with less water and fewer inputs.

As a soil amendment, potassium polyacrylate can improve the soil water holding capacity.

References 

Acrylate polymers
Potassium compounds